Katingan may be,

Katingan Regency, Borneo
Katingan language